Bainang County is a county of Xigazê in the Tibet Autonomous Region.

Towns and townships
 Norbu Khyungtse Town
 Gadong Town
 Pältsel Township
 Mak Township 
 Wangden Township
 Qunub Township
 Düjung Township 
 Jangtö Township 
 Gabug Township
 Tashar Township
 Tongshé Township

Counties of Tibet
Shigatse